An indirect presidential election was held in Hungary on 6–7 June 2005. The main opposition party Fidesz's nominee, the former President of the Constitutional Court László Sólyom was elected President of Hungary.

First and second rounds

Results

References

2005
Hungarian presidential election
Hungarian presidential election